Mollé Mystery Theatre was a 30-minute anthology radio program that ran from 1943 to 1948 on NBC prior to its moving to the CBS network, where the show was altered to center around a single character, Inspector Hearthstone. The show, sponsored initially by Sterling Drugs, manufacturers of Mollé Brushless Shaving Cream, began airing on Tuesday evenings during prime time.

In 1948, Mollé ceased sponsoring the program, and its title became Mystery Theater. It featured stories of mystery and suspense and boasted performances from up-and-coming actors such as Richard Widmark and Frank Lovejoy. The show bears no relation to the radio series ABC Mystery Theater.

References

1940s American radio programs
CBS Radio programs
NBC radio programs
1943 radio programme debuts
American radio dramas